The 1969–70 Czechoslovak Extraliga season was the 27th season of the Czechoslovak Extraliga, the top level of ice hockey in Czechoslovakia. 10 teams participated in the league, and Dukla Jihlava won the championship.

Regular season

1. Liga-Qualification

External links
History of Czechoslovak ice hockey

Czechoslovak Extraliga seasons
Czechoslovak
1970 in Czechoslovak sport
1969 in Czechoslovak sport